Calderbank is a village outside the town of Airdrie, North Lanarkshire, Scotland. It lies west of the M73, on the west bank of the North Calder Water. Other nearby towns include: Airdrie, Coatbridge, Bellshill and Motherwell. It has a population of about 

Etymology
The village's name is of a doubtful etymology. The first part of the name refers to the North Calder Water, the small river that flows through the village: however the second element is unknown. Some sources suggest the second element is from Old English benc "bench". A record of the name from 1182 as Celdrebec suggests this.

History

The village is famous for being the birthplace of the Vulcan, the world's first iron boat, which sailed from Calderbanks Iron Works to the River Clyde and plied the Scottish canals first with passengers and then with cargoes of iron and coal.

Iron from the Calderbanks works was used to build the Queen Mary cruise liner. This part of the canal has been preserved between the village and Sikeside on the outskirts of Coatbridge. And other parts of the canal can be seen in Coatbridge town centre and Drumpelier country park, however much of the canal was covered in the 1950s and 1960s by the M8 motorway which actually runs with the meanders of what was the canal (yet under the motorway large pipes still run water which feed the Forth and Clyde canal today).

Calderbank was the site of early Christian settlement, by monks from Newbattle Abbey in the Borders. This gave the local area the name of Monklands.

Bibliography
Calderbank: an industrial and social history

References

External links

Calderbank at Gazetteer for Scotland

Villages in North Lanarkshire
Airdrie, North Lanarkshire